Creeker II is the ninth full-length studio album by American country rap artist Ryan Upchurch. It was released on April 20, 2019 through Redneck Nation Records, serving as a sequel to his rock-oriented sixth album Creeker (2018). It displays even more hard rock influences than its predecessor. It was announced via Twitter and YouTube by Upchurch in March 2019. The album was produced by Thomas "Greenway" Toner a.k.a. T-Stoner and features contributions from guitarist/co-writer  Travis Tidwell and drummer Kidd Petersen.

The album debuted at number 66 on the Billboard 200, No. 7 on the Top Country Albums chart and No. 10 on the Top Rock Albums chart in the United States.

Track listing 
adapted from iTunes

Charts

References

External links
Upchurch© Creeker 2 album on Redneck Nation

2019 albums
Sequel albums
Upchurch (musician) albums